The DeBarges is the debut album of DeBarge, released by Gordy Records on April 6, 1981. It saw limited success and stalled on the charts; the group felt it was not properly promoted. As a result, they revisited The DeBarges by including two songs on their subsequent recordings: "Queen of My Heart" was included on their third album, In a Special Way, while "Share My World" would be included on their fourth, Rhythm of the Night.

Track listing 

 Side A.

"What's Your Name" (Bobby DeBarge, Bunny DeBarge, El DeBarge) - 4:35
"Dance The Night Away" (Mark DeBarge, Randy DeBarge) - 4:50
"You're So Gentle, So Kind" (Bunny DeBarge, El DeBarge) - 4:40
"Queen of My Heart" (El DeBarge) - 3:49

 Side B.

"Hesitated" (Bunny DeBarge, El DeBarge, Mark DeBarge, Randy DeBarge) - 3:42
"Saving Up (All My Love)" (Bill Gable, Jon Lind) - 4:16
"Share My World" (Bunny DeBarge, El DeBarge) - 5:39
"Strange Romance" (Joe Blocker, Reggie Andrews) - 5:00

Personnel

The DeBarges 
 Bunny DeBarge – lead and backing vocals, vocal arrangements (1-7)
 El (Eldra) DeBarge – Fender Rhodes, lead and backing vocals, vocal arrangements (1-7), rhythm arrangements
 Bobby DeBarge – keyboards, lead and backing vocals, vocal arrangements (1-7), rhythm arrangements, horn and string arrangements
 Randy DeBarge – bass, lead and backing vocals, vocal arrangements (1-7)
 Mark DeBarge – percussion, lead and backing vocals, vocal arrangements (1-7)

Additional Personnel 
 Reggie Andrews – keyboards, rhythm arrangements, vocal arrangements (8)
 Larry Von Nash – keyboards
 Michael Boddicker – synthesizer programming
 Todd Cochran – synthesizer programming
 Charles Fearing – guitars
 Paul Jackson, Jr. – guitars
 Nathan East – bass
 Eddie Watkins, Jr. – bass
 Ollie E. Brown – drums
 Leon "Ndugu" Chancler – drums
 Harvey Mason – drums
 Joe Blocker – vocal arrangements (8)
 Eric Butler – horn and string arrangements
 Clare Fischer – horn and string arrangements

Production 
 Producer – Bobby DeBarge
 Co-Producers – Bunny DeBarge and Eldra DeBarge
 Engineer – Bobby Brooks
 Assistant Engineer – Michael Johnson
 Recorded and Mixed at Motown/Hitsville U.S.A. Recording Studios (Hollywood, CA).
 Art Direction – Johnny Lee
 Design – Ginny Livingston
 Photography – Matthew Rolston

References

1981 debut albums
DeBarge albums
Gordy Records albums